Sphere Books is the name of two British paperback publishers.

History
The original Sphere Books was launched in 1966 by Thomson Corporation. Sphere was sold to Pearson PLC in 1985 and became part of Penguin. The name was retired in 1990.

In 1976, Sphere paid $225,000 for the British publishing rights from Ballantine Books for the novelisation of a forthcoming science fiction film, Star Wars: From the Adventures of Luke Skywalker by George Lucas (ghostwritten by Alan Dean Foster). The book, like the film Star Wars released the following year, was an enormous success and sold out its initial print run. Sphere also published the UK editions of Conan fantasy series by Robert E. Howard. The occult writer Dennis Wheatley edited a series of books published under the umbrella title of The Dennis Wheatley Library of the Occult, which included titles such as Dracula by Bram Stoker, Moonchild by Aleister Crowley, Frankenstein by Mary Shelley and Faust by Johann Wolfgang von Goethe. Sphere's involvement in science fiction was furthered with its Sphere Science Fiction Classics series published throughout the 1970s, which included The World of Null-A and The Pawns of Null-A by A. E. van Vogt, Arthur C. Clarke's The Sands of Mars and Larry Niven's Neutron Star.

In 2006, Hachette Book Group acquired a number of imprints from the Time Warner Book Group, including Little, Brown and Company, Hodder & Stoughton Virago Press and Sphere. Today's Sphere is an imprint of Little, Brown. Writers whose works have been published with Sphere have included Patricia Cornwell, Mark Billingham, Jenny Colgan, Mitch Albom, Nicholas Sparks and Nicholas Evans. Sphere best-sellers have included Long Way Round by Ewan McGregor and Charley Boorman, Ricky Tomlinson's autobiography Ricky, Sharon Osbourne's autobiography Extreme, A Brother's Journey by Richard B. Pelzer, Scar Tissue by Anthony Kiedis and Is It Just Me or Is Everything Shit? by Steve Lowe and Alan McArthur.

Notes and references

External links 
 

Former assets of Thomson Reuters
Book publishing companies of the United Kingdom
1961 establishments in England
Pearson plc
Publishing companies established in 1966
Lagardère Media
Science fiction publishers
Fantasy book publishers
Horror book publishing companies
British speculative fiction publishers